Prunus himalaica is a species of cherry native to Nepal. It is used as an ornamental elsewhere for its attractive shiny mahogany-brown bark. It prefers to grow at about 3,900m above sea level in the Himalayas.

Description

Prunus himalaica is a small deciduous tree or shrub reaching a height of at most 5.5m. The smooth bark is a shiny brown, with prominent horizontal lenticels, similar to the coppery-red bark of the Tibetan cherry, Prunus serrula, and similar to but darker than the brown bark of Prunus rufa. Its younger branches are more purple in color, with brownish-red pubescent coats. The leaves are 4 to 5cm wide and 6 to 8cm long, elliptic in shape, with their upper surfaces bright green and with some minute hairs, while the undersides are pale green with abundant brown hairs on the veins, including the 9 to 13 secondary veins. Leaves have biserrate margins, with caudate to acuminate apices and rounded bases, mounted on a 1cm pubescent petiole. P. himalaica inflorescences are umbellate with one or two flowers attached by 3.5 to 4.5cm pubescent pedicels. The glabrous hypanthia are about 1cm long, and the ovate and glandular-serrate 0.4cm sepals are often reflexed. Petals are a pale pink. Each flower has about 45 stamens.

As an ornamental
All Prunus himalaica grown as ornamentals outside their native range descend from a single individual obtained in 1965 from the Langtang Valley in Nepal by Tony Schilling.

References

 

himalaica
Cherries
Flora of East Himalaya
Endemic flora of Nepal
Ornamental trees
Plants described in 1954